Desert Flower is a 2009 German biographical film directed by Sherry Hormann. It stars Liya Kebede, Sally Hawkins and Craig Parkinson, and is based on the Somali-born model Waris Dirie's autobiography.

Plot
The film follows the journey of Waris Dirie (played by Liya Kebede) from a nomadic pastoralist background in Somalia to a new life and career in the West as a fashion model and activist against female genital mutilation.

Cast
 Liya Kebede as Waris Dirie 
 Sally Hawkins as Marylin 
 Craig Parkinson as Neil 
 Meera Syal as Pushpa Patel 
 Anthony Mackie as Harold Jackson 
 Juliet Stevenson as Lucinda 
 Timothy Spall as Terry Donaldson 
 Soraya Omar-Scego as Waris aged 12 
 Teresa Churcher as Nurse Anne 
 Eckart Friz as Spike 
 Prashant Prabhakar as Kami 
 Anna Hilgedieck as Tilda 
 Matt Kaufman as Burger Bar Manager 
 Emma Kay as Immigration officer 
 Elli as European Man 
 Nick Raio as Truck Driver 
 Robert Robalino as Cafe owner 
 Chris Wilson as Embassy Official 
 Safa Idriss Nour as Little Waris

Production
Asked about the scene where Waris Dirie really struggles with a nude photo shoot, Liya Kebede said, "Being nude really is a problem for me, so it was actually the easiest scene for me to shoot. I definitely identified with how she was feeling."

Awards
 Festival de San Sebastián 2009

References

In-line references

Related links
 Our goals: Waris Dirie Manifesto, desertflowerfoundation.org

External links

2009 films
2009 biographical drama films
English-language German films
Films directed by Sherry Hormann
Films shot in Cologne
Films based on biographies
Films scored by Martin Todsharow
Films set in Somalia
Films set in London
Works about female genital mutilation
2009 drama films
German biographical drama films
Biographical films about models
2000s German films